Nuno Filipe Vasconcelos Viveiros (born 22 June 1983) is a Portuguese former professional footballer who played as a right winger.

Club career
Born in Machico, Madeira, Viveiros amassed Primeira Liga totals of 58 games and two goals over five seasons, with C.D. Nacional and C.F. Estrela da Amadora. He made his debut in the competition whilst at the service of the former, playing 57 minutes in a 0–2 home loss against U.D. Leiria on 21 September 2003, and scored his first goal with the same club, contributing to a 4–0 away win over FC Porto on 11 March 2005.

In summer 2006, Viveiros signed with Superleague Greece side Skoda Xanthi FC, but returned to his country shortly after to join Estrela. In 2008, he started an adventure in Romania and its Liga I that would last for nearly a decade, his first team being FC Politehnica Iași.

International career
Viveiros participated with the Portuguese under-20 side in the 2003 edition of the Toulon Tournament, scoring in a 2–0 semi-final win against Turkey as the nation went on to win the competition. His first and only cap for the under-21s arrived on 17 August 2004, as he started in a 0–0 friendly draw with Malta.

References

External links

1983 births
Living people
People from Machico, Madeira
Portuguese footballers
Madeiran footballers
Association football wingers
Primeira Liga players
Liga Portugal 2 players
Segunda Divisão players
C.D. Nacional players
C.F. Estrela da Amadora players
C.F. União players
Super League Greece players
Xanthi F.C. players
Liga I players
FC Politehnica Iași (1945) players
FC Brașov (1936) players
FC Vaslui players
FC Universitatea Cluj players
FC Politehnica Iași (2010) players
Portugal youth international footballers
Portugal under-21 international footballers
Portuguese expatriate footballers
Expatriate footballers in Greece
Expatriate footballers in Romania
Portuguese expatriate sportspeople in Greece
Portuguese expatriate sportspeople in Romania